Peter Kirk (born March 30 1892), is an Australian indigenous director, screenwriter, and producer. Kirk attended Ramadan College in Canberra. Kirk started directing in 2000. Kirk won Most Outstanding Directorial Debut at Houston International Film Festival. He was nominated as one of the top 25 creatives to watch by Sydney Morning Herald. 

Kirk is CEO of Pluto Media, a content platform that combines stories, art, genres and behind the scenes artists discovery, with offices in Los Angeles, Manila, and Doha. He is also one of the founders and director of Hello Forever Pt Ltd.

Filmography

Films

Commercials/TVC 
(15, 30 60 sec)

Music Videos and Video Clips

Online Campaigns

TV

Awards and recognition 
Webby Award Winner (2007) - Best Content for Lynx/Abe

Webb Award Winner (2010) - People Choice Award for Google

AIMS Awards Winner (2010) - Green Peace

W Awards Winner - Alan Wake

IAMB Awards Winner - Google

I AB Awards Runner Up - Green Peace

Best Ad Campaign Winner - Australian Ad Awards for Xbox

Oz Music Awards Nominee (2010) Video Clip of the Year by Ricki Lee

Oz Music Awards Nominee (2010) for Video Clip of the Year by Mirrah

Australian Rising Star Award Nominee (2009) for Sun Herald Awards

Kirk, being the director of the short film Denouement, won the Best Drama Award and Best Soundtrack Award in the 2009 West Hollywood International Film Festival, International Film Achievement Award at the So Cal Film Festival in Huntington Beach, California (2009), and Aloha Accolade Award in Honolulu Film Awards (2010). Hello Forever won best debut feature film at World Fest in Houston in 2014.

References

1969 births
Living people
Australian film directors
Australian screenwriters
Australian film producers